CKCS-DT (channel 32) is a television station in Calgary, Alberta, Canada, part of the Yes TV system. Owned and operated by Crossroads Christian Communications, the station has studios at 5 Avenue and 8 Street Southwest in Downtown Calgary, and its transmitter is located in the Prominence Point neighborhood on the city's west side.

History
Licensed by the Canadian Radio-television and Telecommunications Commission (CRTC) on June 8, 2007, the station began broadcasting five months later on October 8, 2007 on UHF channel 32.

CTS was rebranded as "Yes TV" on September 1, 2014. The rebranding coincides with the introduction of several secular programs into the schedule such as American Idol, Wheel of Fortune and Jeopardy!.

Programming
Yes TV airs programming intended for family viewing, mostly based on Christian values, including dramas, comedies, mini-series and reality, game, and talk shows; although Yes TV also features shows on political commentary and other religions, including Judaism, Islam and Sikhism. Yes TV also airs secular mainstream programs during prime time hours. It is governed by the CRTC's Religious Broadcast Regulations and follows a policy of not airing shows containing "coarse language, gratuitous violence or explicit sexual scenes."

Technical information

Subchannel

Analogue-to-digital conversion
On August 11, 2011, 3½ weeks before the official August 31 date in which Canadian television stations in CRTC-designated mandatory markets transitioned from analogue to digital broadcasts, the station shut down its analogue signal and flash cut its digital signal into operation on UHF channel 32.

References

External links
Yes TV Calgary
 

KCS-DT
KCS-DT
Television channels and stations established in 2007
2007 establishments in Alberta